Music Academy may refer to:

 Music Academy (journal), a Russian peer-reviewed academic journal about music
 Music Academy of the West, a classical music training program in Montecito, California
 Music school, an educational institution specialized in the study, training, and research of music

See also
 Baku Academy of Music 
 Franz Liszt Academy of Music
 City of Basel Music Academy
 Estonian Academy of Music and Theatre
 Gheorghe Dima National Music Academy
 Madras Music Academy
 Lithuanian Academy of Music and Theatre
 Red Bull Music Academy
 Sarajevo Music Academy
 University of Montenegro Music Academy
 Academy of Music, University of Zagreb